This is an incomplete table containing prophets, sometimes called messengers, of the Abrahamic religions.



See also
 Books of the Bible
 List of burial places of Abrahamic figures
 List of founders of religious traditions
 People of the Book

List of Prophets
 Prophets in Judaism
 Prophets of Christianity
 List of Book of Mormon prophets
 Prophets and messengers in Islam
 Prophethood (Ahmadiyya)
 Prophets in the Baháʼí Faith

Footnotes

Notes

Bibliography 
 

Abrahamic religions
Prophets